Haghorti or Kendkhurd is a village de facto in the Martuni Province of the breakaway Republic of Artsakh, de jure in the Khojavend District of Azerbaijan, in the disputed region of Nagorno-Karabakh.

History 
During the Soviet period, the village was a part of the Martuni District of the Nagorno-Karabakh Autonomous Oblast.

Historical heritage sites 
Historical heritage sites in and around the village include the church of Surb Astvatsatsin built in 1751.

Economy and culture 
The population is mainly engaged in agriculture and animal husbandry. As of 2015, the village has a municipal building, a house of culture, a secondary school, and a medical centre.

Demographics 
The village has an ethnic Armenian-majority population, had 231 inhabitants in 2005, and 200 inhabitants in 2015.

References

External links 
 

Populated places in Martuni Province
Populated places in Khojavend District